The following lists events that happened during 1931 in Chile.

Incumbents
President of Chile: Carlos Ibáñez del Campo (until 26 July), Pedro Opaso (27 July), Juan Esteban Montero (until 20 August), Manuel Trucco (until 15 November), Juan Esteban Montero

Events

August
31 August – Chilean naval mutiny of 1931

October
4 October – Chilean presidential election, 1931

December
25 December – Norte Grande insurrection

Births 
13 February – Gonzalo Figueroa Garcia Huidobro (d. 2008)
 21 July – Leon Schidlowsky (d. 2022)
7 August – Fernando Rosas Pfingsthorn (d. 2007)
14 August – Jaime Ramírez (d. 2003)
12 October – Ricardo Yrarrázaval Larraín
November – Guillermo Jullian de la Fuente (d. 2008)

Deaths
15 May – Emiliano Figueroa (b. 1866)

References 

 
Years of the 20th century in Chile
Chile